KSR-2 (Korean Sounding Rocket-2) is a South Korean sounding rocket designed by KARI.

Spec 
 Payload: 150 kg
 Apogee: 160 km
 Thrust: 86 kN
 Weight: 2000 kg
 Diameter: 0.42 m
 Length: 11.04 m
 Launch: July 9, 1997 (1st)/June 11, 1998 (2nd)

See also 
 KARI KSR-1
 KARI KSR-3
 KSLV-I
 KSLV-II

General references 
KSR-II on Encyclopedia Astronautica

References

Sounding rockets of South Korea